The Association for Free Software (or AFFS) was a member organization, based in the United Kingdom, for the advancement of free software (sometimes also called "open-source software"). It was an associate organization of Free Software Foundation Europe (FSFE).

History 
In 2002, AFFS announced that it was now associated with the FSF Europe.

By 2009 it was effectively defunct.

References

External links

 The AFFS domain (affs.org.uk) is now being used for SEO.

Free Software Foundation
Science and technology in the United Kingdom